Ramadhani Nkunzingoma (born 2 September 1977) is a Rwandan footballer. He played in 22 matches for the Rwanda national football team from 2002 to 2007. He was also named in Rwanda's squad for the 2004 African Cup of Nations tournament.

References

1977 births
Living people
Rwandan footballers
Rwanda international footballers
2004 African Cup of Nations players
Association football goalkeepers